The 57 Mountain Division headquarters are at Leimakhong near Imphal, Manipur.

History
Previously the division was headquartered in Masimpur near Silchar. Later it is shifted to Manipur.

Area Serve
The formation and units of the Division operates in some of the remote corner of Manipur along with Indo-Burmese border. This Army Division cooperates with Assam Rifles Imphal Sector wing for any insurgency in Manipur .

Previous Commander
 Maj. Gen. Iqbal Singh (2001)

References

Divisions of the Indian Army